Cory Lopez (born March 21, 1977) is a professional surfer from Dunedin, Florida, United States. Lopez is a three-time X Games gold medalist, U.S. Open of Surfing champion, Billabong Pro Tahiti campion, Globe SI Pro champion, and a gold and silver medalist at the ISA World Championships in Costa Rica (2010) and China (2012). He has been a top ranked contender on the ASP World Surfing circuit (ASP World Tour) for multiple years.

Biography
Lopez and his older brother, Shea, were taught to surf by their father Pete Lopez, also a surfer. They began to compete in the ESA Menehune Division.

Lopez participated with Shea and Andy Irons on the ASP World Tour. In 2003. Lopez won two Surfer Mag 'Guts for Glory Awards' by pushing the limits. He also won Surfer Magazine's Tube of the Year award in 2009 for discovering the "mile long" left point at Skeleton Bay, Namibia, and placed tenth for overall editorial exposure in the 2010 Transworld Surf Media Exposure rankings.

Lopez lives in Florida with his wife Jenn and children Alana and Luke. He owns Nekton Surf Shop in Indian Rocks Beach and is also a motivational speaker and special needs teacher.

References

External links
 
Nekton Surf Shop

American surfers
World Surf League surfers
Living people
1977 births
People from Dunedin, Florida